Arandina Club de Fútbol is a Spanish football team based in Aranda de Duero, in the autonomous community of Castile and León. Founded in 1987, it plays in Tercera División RFEF – Group 8, holding home games at Estadio El Montecillo, with a capacity of 6,000 seats.

History
After the disappearance of the historic SD Gimnástica Arandina, in 1987 local football was represented by Unión Deportiva Aranda (founded in 1983). On 29 July 1987, on the assembly it was decided to withdraw this club and employ part of its most prominent players along with new ones to form a new club, Arandina Club de Fútbol.

Club background
Club Deportivo Aranda - (1920–23)
Sociedad Gimnástica Arandina - (1923–25)
Aranda Fútbol Club - (1925–27)
Gimnástica Arandina (I) - (1927–33)
Cultural Arandina - (1932)
Club Deportivo Imperial - (1933)
Gimnástica Arandina - (1948–87)
Arandina Club de Fútbol - (1987–)

Season to season

3 seasons in Segunda División B
27 seasons in Tercera División
1 season in Tercera División RFEF

Current squad

Former players
 Niche
 Pablo Infante

Former coaches
 Miguel Ángel Portugal
 Julio Velázquez

References

External links
Official website 
Futbolme team profile 

Football clubs in Castile and León
Association football clubs established in 1987
1987 establishments in Spain
Sport in Aranda de Duero